Mahodand Lake (- "Lake of Fishes") is a lake located in the upper Usho Valley at a distance of about  from Kalam in Swat District of Khyber Pakhtunkhwa province of Pakistan. The lake is accessible by a four-wheel drive vehicle, and is often utilized for fishing and boating.

Geography

Similarly, the banks of Mahodand lake are covered by pines and pastures that serve as a camping site during the summer. 
The Mahodand lake is fed by melting glaciers and springs of the Hindu Kush mountain and gives rise to Ushu Khwar, the major left tributary of the Swat River.

Flora and fauna
During the winter, the Mahodand lake freezes and is covered by heavy snow. In the summers, the basin of the lake is surrounded by a sheet of alpine flowers like geum, blue poppy, potentilla and gentian. Apart from it, the lake is encircled by diverse pinus species which serves as abode for wild birds. Similarly, the lake contains abounding trout fishes, which furnish ideal opportunity for angling, but catching is allowed only to the licensed anglers.

Fishing and camping

Visitors fish and camp at the lake. The waters of Mahodand lake are divided into a series of small and large streams, which once swarmed with brown and rainbow trout introduced by the former ruler of Swat State. Over-fishing by the locals for daily income, along with the illegal use of fishing methods like electrocution, dynamiting, and large nets, have significantly reduced the fish population.

See also
Lake Saiful Muluk - Kaghan Valley
Dudipatsar Lake - Kaghan Valley
Saidgai Lake - Swat Valley
Kundol Lake - Kalam Valley
Daral Lake - Swat Valley

References

External link

Hotel booking near Mahodand
Lakes of Khyber Pakhtunkhwa
Swat District
Swat Kohistan
Tourist attractions in Swat
Tourism in Khyber Pakhtunkhwa